Estádio Manoel Dantas Barretto or Barrettão, as it is usually called is a stadium located in Ceará-Mirim, Brazil. It is used mostly for football matches and hosts the home matches of Globo. The stadium has a maximum capacity of 10,000 people.

References

External links
Barrettão on OGol

Globo Futebol Clube
Football venues in Rio Grande do Norte
Sports venues completed in 2013
2013 establishments in Brazil